The Seohae Bridge is a cable-stayed bridge that connects Pyongtaek and Dangjin, South Korea.  Bridge construction started in 1993 and was completed in 2000 at a cost of 677.7 billion won. A prop (and some precast segments) fell on August 5, 1999 under construction due to Typhoon Olga. The bridge opened on November 9, 2000.

See also
Transportation in South Korea
List of bridges in South Korea
List of longest cable-stayed bridge spans

References 

Bridges in South Korea
Bridges completed in 2000
Pyeongtaek
Dangjin
Buildings and structures in Gyeonggi Province
Transport in Gyeonggi Province
Buildings and structures in South Chungcheong Province
Transport in South Chungcheong Province